Johanna's Law, also known as the Gynecologic Cancer Education and Awareness Act, promotes the education of women to increase awareness of gynecologic cancer, which include ovarian, uterine/endometrial, cervical, vaginal, and vulvar cancers and the risk factors and symptoms. Often, these cancers are far advanced before detection. Increased awareness could lead to earlier detection and reduced morbidity, and could save lives.

Senators Arlen Specter and Tom Harkin introduced the Bill in the Senate on June 6, 2005. Senator Barack Obama co-sponsored it. It passed both  Houses of Congress unanimously and was signed into law on January 12, 2007, by George W. Bush. Congressman Burton's legislative aide, Brian Fauls actively advocated for the bill and engaged in many heated discussions with Congressman Joe Barton of Texas.

It was named for a school teacher, Johanna Silver Gordon, who died of ovarian cancer in 2000,  aged 58.

References

External links
HR 1245: "Johanna's Law"
FAQs

United States federal health legislation
Acts of the 109th United States Congress